Pöyrisjärvi a medium-sized lake in the Kemijoki main catchment area in the Enontekiö municipality of Finland, close to the border with Norway.

See also
List of lakes in Finland

References

Landforms of Lapland (Finland)
Lakes of Enontekiö